The 1938 Marshall Thundering Herd football team was an American football team that represented Marshall University in the Buckeye Conference during the 1938 college football season. In its fourth season under head coach Cam Henderson, the team compiled a 5–4 record, 3–1 against conference opponents, and outscored opponents by a total of 274 to 67. Nelson Bragg was the team captain.

Schedule

References

Marshall
Marshall Thundering Herd football seasons
Marshall Thundering Herd football